is a Japanese manga series written and illustrated by Asuka Konishi. It has been serialized in Kodansha's Monthly Afternoon since August 2017.

Plot
Yoshino Somei is a high school girl who was born and raised in a yakuza family. Although her family environment is unique, she has spent her days quietly and peacefully. This all changes when she finds out that her grandfather has arranged for her to be married to the heir of another yakuza family, Kirishima Miyama.

Publication
Yakuza Fiancé: Raise wa Tanin ga Ii is written and illustrated by Asuka Konishi. The series began in Kodansha's Monthly Afternoon on August 25, 2017. Kodansha has collected its chapters into individual tankōbon volumes. The first volume was released on November 22, 2017. As of January 23, 2023, seven volumes have been released. 

In February 2022, Seven Seas Entertainment announced that they had licensed the manga for English release in North America and the first volume is set to be published in November 2022.

Volume list

Reception
Yakuza Fiancé: Raise wa Tanin ga Ii won the 4th Next Manga Award in the print category in 2018. Along with The Way of the Househusband, it ranked 8th on Takarajimasha's Kono Manga ga Sugoi! 2019 ranking of Top 20 manga series for male readers. The series ranked 11th on "Nationwide Bookstore Employees' Recommended Comics of 2018" by the Honya Club website. The series ranked 48th on the 2020 "Book of the Year" list by Da Vinci magazine. The manga has been nominated for the 46th Kodansha Manga Award in the general category in 2022.

References

External links
  

Drama anime and manga
Kodansha manga
Marriage in anime and manga
Romance anime and manga
Seinen manga
Seven Seas Entertainment titles
Yakuza in anime and manga